Following are lists of members of the Australian House of Representatives:

Members of the Australian House of Representatives, 1901–1903
Members of the Australian House of Representatives, 1903–1906
Members of the Australian House of Representatives, 1906–1910
Members of the Australian House of Representatives, 1910–1913
Members of the Australian House of Representatives, 1913–1914
Members of the Australian House of Representatives, 1914–1917
Members of the Australian House of Representatives, 1917–1919
Members of the Australian House of Representatives, 1919–1922
Members of the Australian House of Representatives, 1922–1925
Members of the Australian House of Representatives, 1925–1928
Members of the Australian House of Representatives, 1928–1929
Members of the Australian House of Representatives, 1929–1931
Members of the Australian House of Representatives, 1931–1934
Members of the Australian House of Representatives, 1934–1937
Members of the Australian House of Representatives, 1937–1940
Members of the Australian House of Representatives, 1940–1943
Members of the Australian House of Representatives, 1943–1946
Members of the Australian House of Representatives, 1946–1949
Members of the Australian House of Representatives, 1949–1951
Members of the Australian House of Representatives, 1951–1954
Members of the Australian House of Representatives, 1954–1955
Members of the Australian House of Representatives, 1955–1958
Members of the Australian House of Representatives, 1958–1961
Members of the Australian House of Representatives, 1961–1963
Members of the Australian House of Representatives, 1963–1966
Members of the Australian House of Representatives, 1966–1969
Members of the Australian House of Representatives, 1969–1972
Members of the Australian House of Representatives, 1972–1974
Members of the Australian House of Representatives, 1974–1975
Members of the Australian House of Representatives, 1975–1977
Members of the Australian House of Representatives, 1977–1980
Members of the Australian House of Representatives, 1980–1983
Members of the Australian House of Representatives, 1983–1984
Members of the Australian House of Representatives, 1984–1987
Members of the Australian House of Representatives, 1987–1990
Members of the Australian House of Representatives, 1990–1993
Members of the Australian House of Representatives, 1993–1996
Members of the Australian House of Representatives, 1996–1998
Members of the Australian House of Representatives, 1998–2001
Members of the Australian House of Representatives, 2001–2004
Members of the Australian House of Representatives, 2004–2007
Members of the Australian House of Representatives, 2007–2010
Members of the Australian House of Representatives, 2010–2013
Members of the Australian House of Representatives, 2013–2016
Members of the Australian House of Representatives, 2016–2019
Members of the Australian House of Representatives, 2019–2022
Members of the Australian House of Representatives, 2022–2025

See also
 List of Australian federal by-elections

 
Members of the Australian House of Representatives